Bulloo Downs Station most commonly referred to as Bulloo Downs is a pastoral lease that operates as a cattle station in the Shire of Bulloo, Queensland, Australia. It is located on the traditional lands of the Bitjara.

The property encompasses a portion of the Bulloo River and its floodplains. The property adjoins Naryilco Station.

Mick and Marie Gibson acquired Bulloo Downs in 2004 paying 20 million for the property following the breakup of the Stanbroke Pastoral Company by Peter Menegazzo.

History
In 1894 the property was owned by Messrs. Jones, Green and Sullivan and was carrying 43,000 head of cattle. The property was then struck by drought for a year the herd was reduced down to 14,000 head. The cattle bred up to a herd of 18,000, then another even longer-lasting drought reduced the herd to 2,700 head in 1900. Sir Sidney Kidman acquired the property in 1903 for £20,000 when it was stocked with only 3,000 head of cattle.

See also
List of ranches and stations

References

Stations (Australian agriculture)
Pastoral leases in Queensland
South West Queensland